Ashmesian (also Romanized as Āshmesīān and Ashmasiyan; also known as Ash Masteyān, Āsh Mestīān, Āshmīsīān, Asmesīān, and Asmesiyān) is a village in Chahar Cheshmeh Rural District, Kamareh District, Khomeyn County, Markazi Province, Iran. At the 2006 census, its population was 167, in 45 families.

See also 
Ashmesian (fa)

Ashmesian (instagram)

References 

Populated places in Khomeyn County